The Royal George Hotel (also known as The Royal George) is a hotel and restaurant in Perth, Scotland. It is a Category B listed building dating to 1773. Its main entrance is on George Street, though its Tay Street frontage, overlooking the River Tay, is more well known. It is named for George III.

Notable visitors to the hotel include Empress Eugenie and Queen Victoria, her husband, Albert, Prince Consort, and their children, who stayed there on 29 September, 1848, during their journey south after holidaying at Balmoral Castle. (William Murray, 4th Earl of Mansfield, was out of town and, thus, they were unable to stay at Scone Palace, just under two miles to the north.) It was Victoria's first time staying in a hotel. After breakfast at the hotel the following morning, the family left for Carlisle on the recently built Scottish Central Railway. Then named The George Inn, the business was renamed The Royal George Hotel in her honour. (The street adjacent to the property on its southern side is named George Inn Lane.) Both the Royal Warrant and two lamps from the room the monarch slept in are still in the hotel today.

Queen Victoria returned to Perth in 1864 to unveil a statue of her husband, who died three years earlier, at the North Inch.

Local architect Donald Alexander Stewart, in partnership with Robert Matthew Mitchell, did some reconstruction work on the hotel in 1927.

Prince Edward, Earl of Wessex, dined at the hotel in 2003.

The hotel has 45 rooms.

Gallery

See also
 List of listed buildings in Perth, Scotland

References

External links

Main entrance on George Street – Google Street View, March 2019
View from Tay Street – Google Street View, March 2019

Listed buildings in Perth, Scotland
Hotel buildings completed in 1773
Listed hotels in Scotland
Category B listed buildings in Perth and Kinross
1773 establishments in Scotland
Hotels in Perth and Kinross